Anthurium alluriquinense is a species of flowering plant in the family Araceae, native to Colombia and Ecuador. It is most similar to A.longicaudatum.

References

alluriquinense
Flora of Colombia
Flora of Ecuador
Plants described in 2008